The Roman Catholic Diocese of Choluteca (erected 8 September 1964, as the Territorial Prelature of Choluteca) is a suffragan of the Archdiocese of Tegucigalpa. It was elevated on 29 August 1979.

Bishops

Ordinaries
Marcel Gérin y Boulay, P.M.E. (1964–1984)
Raúl Corriveau, P.M.E. (1984–2005) – Bishop Emeritus
Guido Plante, P.M.E. (2005–2012)
Guy Charbonneau, P.M.E. (2013–2023)
Teodoro Gómez Rivera (2023-)

Coadjutor bishops
Raúl Corriveau, P.M.E. (1980–1984)
Guido Plante, P.M.E. (204-2005)

See also
List of Roman Catholic dioceses in Honduras

References

Choluteca
Choluteca
Choluteca
Roman Catholic Ecclesiastical Province of Tegucigalpa